Akash Vasisht (born 17 December 1994) is an Indian cricketer who plays for Himachal Pradesh. He made his Twenty20 debut on 18 November 2019, for Himachal Pradesh in the 2019–20 Syed Mushtaq Ali Trophy. He made his List A debut on 21 February 2021, for Himachal Pradesh in the 2020–21 Vijay Hazare Trophy.

In IPL 2023, Akash Vashisht was bought by the Rajasthan Royals at the Base price of 20 Lakhs.

References

External links
 

1994 births
Living people
Indian cricketers
Himachal Pradesh cricketers
Cricketers from Himachal Pradesh